Somehow Good is a 1927 British silent drama film directed by Jack Raymond and starring Fay Compton, Stewart Rome and Dorothy Boyd. It was made at Twickenham Studios and premiered in October 1927.

Cast
 Fay Compton as Rosalind Nightingale
 Stewart Rome as Jerry Harrison
 Dorothy Boyd as Sally
 Colin Keith-Johnston as Doctor
 Frank Perfitt as Dederich
 J. Fisher White as Old Fossil

References

Bibliography
 Low, Rachel. The History of British Film: Volume IV, 1918–1929. Routledge, 1997.

External links

1927 films
1927 drama films
Films directed by Jack Raymond
British silent feature films
Films set in England
Films shot at Twickenham Film Studios
British films based on plays
British drama films
British black-and-white films
1920s English-language films
1920s British films
Silent drama films